KRNV-DT (channel 4) is a television station in Reno, Nevada, United States, affiliated with NBC. It is owned by Cunningham Broadcasting, which maintains joint sales and shared services agreements (JSA/SSA) with Sinclair Broadcast Group, owner of Fox affiliate KRXI-TV (channel 11), for the provision of certain services. However, Sinclair effectively owns KRNV-DT as the majority of Cunningham's stock is owned by the family of deceased group founder Julian Smith. Sinclair also manages primary sports-formatted independent station and secondary MyNetworkTV affiliate KNSN-TV (channel 21) under a separate JSA with Deerfield Media.

The stations share studios on Vassar Street in Reno, while KRNV-DT's transmitter is located on Slide Mountain between SR 431 and I-580/US 395/US 395 ALT in unincorporated Washoe County.

From 1997 until 2018, KRNV operated a semi-satellite in Elko, Nevada, KENV-DT (channel 10), which simulcast all NBC network and syndicated programming as provided through its parent but aired separate commercial inserts, legal identifications, and weekday morning newscasts. Even though KENV currently maintains its own studio facilities, master control and some internal operations are based at KRNV's studios in Reno; KENV is now a TBD-operated station.

History

The station was founded on September 30, 1962, as KCRL. It aired an analog signal on VHF channel 4 and was the second television station in Northern Nevada. The Sunbelt Communications Company purchased channel 4 in 1989 and the call letters became the current KRNV on January 22, 1990. The station has always been an NBC affiliate, although it shared ABC with KOLO-TV until 1967. It is the only one of the "Big Three" affiliated stations in Reno to have never changed its primary affiliation.

It signed on KENV in Elko on March 25, 1997, as a semi-satellite, providing Nevada-based programming to the Nevada side of the Salt Lake City, Utah market. The station operated another satellite, KWNV channel 7, in Winnemucca, but this went silent on July 1, 2008.

On December 19, 2006, KRNV began broadcasting its local newscasts in high definition, making it the first station in the market to do so (although local PBS station KNPB became the first in Northern Nevada to offer digital broadcasts on September 29, 2000).

On September 11, 2010, KRNV debuted public affairs show To the Point with Anjeanette Damon. Damon's first guest was Republican Gubernatorial nominee (now former Governor) Brian Sandoval. The main guest on her second show was Democratic Gubernatorial nominee Rory Reid. To the Point aired Saturdays at 4:30 p.m. Beginning on November 6, 2010, To the Point was simulcast statewide on KRNV, KENV and KSNV until the show finale on November 9, 2013.

On November 22, 2013, Sinclair Broadcast Group announced the acquisition of KRNV's non-license assets, for $26 million. Sinclair already owned KRXI-TV and operated KAME-TV in Reno. On December 19, it was announced that Cunningham Broadcasting would acquire the license assets of KRNV and KENV for $6.5 million. The sale was approved on September 22, 2017, and was completed on January 9, 2018. Sinclair could not buy KRNV-DT outright because Reno has only six full-power stations—three too few to legally permit a duopoly. With the sale to Cunningham, Sinclair now controls half of those stations. The sale also created a situation in which a Fox affiliate is the nominal senior partner in a duopoly involving an NBC affiliate and a "Big Three" station.

KRNV became the second station in the country to do regularly scheduled Monday through Friday daily web-only newscasts powered by Google's G+ Hangouts on January 25, 2012. The webcast started at 11:00 a.m. Pacific Time and incorporated people in a news-talk format from all around the world. An on-air show featuring Google+ at 11:00 am debuted September 24, 2012, under the name News 4 Forum. The first News 4 Forum featured Steve Grove, Head of Community Development at Google+. President Barack Obama did his second Google+ hangout on the News 4 Forum on the 2012 United States presidential election. Google shut down its Google+ social networking service on April 2, 2019.

Programming
In addition to the NBC network schedule, syndicated programs featured on KRNV-DT include Dr. Phil, Judge Judy, and Entertainment Tonight, among others. KRNV is one of a few NBC affiliates to air paid programming on weekdays.

News operation

KRNV presently broadcasts 22½ hours of local newscasts each week (with 4½ hours each weekday and 2 hours each on Saturdays and Sundays).

KRNV produces the only hour-long 6:00 p.m. newscast on weeknights in the Reno area. KRNV airs the NBC Nightly News at 5:30 p.m. while KTVN and KOLO-TV air their national newscasts at 6:00 p.m. On April 2, 2012, KRNV became the first station to offer a 4:00 p.m. newscast on the market. Other newscasts include a two-hour long News 4 Today that runs from 5:00-7:00 a.m. and News 4 at 5:00 and 11:00 p.m.

KRNV partners with Sam Shad Productions to air The Dining Show at 12:30 p.m. on Fridays.

KRNV became the first station in recent history to produce a local "Coaches-Style" sports show on television featuring University of Nevada Wolf Pack sports. Wolf Pack All Access debuted Sunday, September 9, 2012, after Sunday Night Football.

Notable former on-air staff
 Bonnie Bernstein – former KRNV sports anchor; former ESPN and CBS Sports reporter/host
 Contessa Brewer – former general assignment reporter; former MSNBC anchor; CNBC reporter
 Steve Handelsman – national political correspondent for NBC News' Washington, D.C. bureau (1984–2017); now retired
 Mark Hyman – national political commentator for Sinclair Broadcast Group's Behind the Headlines (2013–2018); now retired
 Jon Ralston – host of Ralston Reports (2010–2014); now retired and co-founder of The Nevada Independent (2017–present)
 Jim Rogers – station owner and founder of the Intermountain West Communications Company (1979–2014); now deceased

Technical information

Subchannels
The station's digital signal is multiplexed:

Analog-to-digital conversion
KRNV shut down its analog signal, over VHF channel 4, on June 12, 2009, the official date in which full-power television stations in the United States transitioned from analog to digital broadcasts under federal mandate. The station's digital signal remained on its pre-transition VHF channel 7. Through the use of PSIP, digital television receivers display the station's virtual channel as its former VHF analog channel 4.

Translators

References

External links
 

NBC network affiliates
Dabl affiliates
TBD (TV network) affiliates
Sinclair Broadcast Group
Television channels and stations established in 1962
1962 establishments in Nevada
RNV-DT